Zlatarić is a surname. Notable people with the surname include:

Dinko Zlatarić (1558–1613), Croatian poet and translator from Dubrovnik, considered the best translator of the Croatian Renaissance
House of Zlatarić ("zlatar" meaning "goldsmith" in Croatian), an old noble family from Dubrovnik with origins in Dalmatia
Nebojša Zlatarić (born 1953), Serbian former striker

See also 

 Zlatarić, Valjevo, a village in Serbia

Notes

References